The TREKOL-39294 is a Russian six-wheeled amphibious all-terrain vehicle produced by TREKOL. The 39294 is available in two versions: passenger and freight and it uses large low-pressure tires. TREKOL manufactures the 39294 using UAZ and GAZ parts, which ensures easy operation, easy maintenance and repairs. The fiberglass body has a very low thermal conductivity and the possibility of operating at a temperature of −45 °C to 45 °C. The vehicle has a capacity, in the passenger models, for up to 8 people. Maximum speed −70 km/h. All-terrain vehicles may be equipped with petrol or diesel engines, as well as water jet to move through the water.

It is also featured in the game Snowrunner renamed as the Yar 87.

Specifications

 Axles: 6 × 6;
 Curb weight: 2800 kg;
 Load capacity on solid ground: 700 kg;
 Capacity on soft ground and water: 400 kg;
 Overall length/width/height: 5670/2540/2715 mm;
 Track: 1900 mm;
 Ground clearance: 490 mm;
 Engine: gasoline ZMZ-4062.10 (optional - diesel Hyundai D4BF);
 Engine capacity: 2.3 liters;
 Engine power: 66.2 kW (90 hp..) At 4500 rev / min;
 Maximum torque: 172.6 Nm (17.6 kgcm) at 2500 rev / min;
 Fuel: 92 octane gasoline ;
 Fuel consumption at a speed of 50 km/h: 14 L/100 km;
 Fuel capacity: 100 L;
 Transmission: 4-speed;
 Transfer case: 2-speed, inter-axle differential with forced locking, power integral type;
 Body: Fiberglass, 3-door.;
 Number of seats: 8;
 The number of heaters in the back of: 1;
 Tires TREKOL: 1300h600-533, tubeless, low pressure;
 Operating pressure in the tire: 10 ... 50 kPa (0.1 ... 0.5 kg / cm ²);
 Minimum pressure of the tires on the ground: 12 kPa (0.12 kg / cm ²);
 The maximum speed on the highway/water: 70/10 km/h (with outboard motor);

References

External links
 39294 at the TREKOL website

Cars of Russia
Six-wheeled vehicles
ATVs
Wheeled amphibious vehicles